Express mail is an expedited mail delivery service for which the customer pays a premium for faster delivery. Express mail is a service for domestic and international mail, and is in most nations governed by the country's own postal administration. Since 1999, the international express delivery services are governed by the EMS Cooperative.

Express Mail Service and the EMS Cooperative

Express Mail Service (EMS) is an international express postal service offered by postal-administration members of the Universal Postal Union (UPU).  These administrators created the EMS Cooperative in 1998, within the framework of the UPU, to promote the harmonization and development of postal services worldwide. , EMS was offered by more than 190 countries and territories worldwide.

An independent auditor measures the express delivery performance of all international EMS operators, and EMS Performance Awards are based on postal operators' performance, including service performance and tracking: gold, silver, or bronze certificate are awarded to EMS Cooperative members depending on their yearly performance.  These EMS award winners are recorded in the EMS Cooperative's Hall of Fame.

EMS Cooperative members

Since its creation, 182 postal administrations have joined the EMS Cooperative, representing over 85% of EMS operators worldwide.

Other providers
Many transportation logistics firms offer similar accelerated services. DHL Express ("DHL"), Federal Express ("FedEx"), and United Parcel Service ("UPS")  are the most popular alternatives. However, in many countries such alternative carriers' shipments have different status for several legal purposes. For example, in Russia, shipments from abroad to individuals for private needs are exempt from customs duties if valued less than €1000 and sent via post or EMS, while when sent by other means the exemption applies to values below €250 only. In some countries legal notification sent by post and EMS are deemed made on the date of dispatch, while for other couriers on the date of delivery only.

See also
Express mail in the United States
Gallows letter
Mail
Pony Express
Postal administration
S10 (UPU standard)
Surface Air Lifted (SAL)

References

External links

 (previously called "Express Mail")

 
Postal systems
Philatelic terminology